This article concerns the period 679 BC – 670 BC.

Events and trends
 677 BC—Esarhaddon leads the Assyrian army against rebellious Arab tribes, advances as far as the Brook of Egypt.
 676 BC—Zhou Hui Wang becomes emperor of the Zhou Dynasty of China.
 675 BC—Esarhaddon begins the rebuilding of Babylon
 674 BC—Esarhaddon puts down a revolt in Ashkelon supported by Taharqa, king of Kush and Egypt. In response, the Assyrians invade Egypt, but Taharqa is able to hold them off.
 673 BC—Tullus Hostilius becomes the third King of Rome.
 671 BC—Esarhaddon again invades Egypt, this time successfully, capturing Memphis as well as a number of the royal family.

Significant people
 Esarhaddon, King of Assyria and conqueror of Egypt (reigned 681–669 BC)
 Argaeus I, who acceded to the kingship of Macedon with his father's death; he reigned from c. 678 BC to c. 640 BC
 Zhou Hui Wang, ruler of China during the Zhou Dynasty

Deaths
 678 BC—approximate date of death of Perdiccas I, king of Macedon 
 673 BC—Numa Pompilius, second of the Kings of Rome, successor to Romulus
 670 BC—Mettius Fufetius, Latin king of Alba Longa

References